Seelampur is a neighborhood in Delhi, India and one of the subdivisions of North East Delhi district.

References 

 

Neighbourhoods in Delhi
District subdivisions of Delhi